B. M. Mubarak was elected to the Tamil Nadu Legislative Assembly from the Gudalur constituency in the 1996 elections. He was a candidate of the Dravida Munnetra Kazhagam (DMK) party.

Mubarak was chief whip for the DMK between 1996-2001 and unsuccessfully stood again for election to the Assembly in the 2016 elections. On that occasion he contested the Coonoor constituency. The seat had long been held by the DMK but supporters of the incumbent, K. Ramachandran, had threatened to rebel after he was deselected in favour of Mubarak, who had also been given the post of district secretary of the party in Nilgiris. Ramachandran had been stripped of that district secretary office in 2014.

References 

Tamil Nadu MLAs 1996–2001
Dravida Munnetra Kazhagam politicians
Year of birth missing (living people)
Living people